Ptericoptus panamensis is a species of beetle in the family Cerambycidae. It was described by Bates in 1880. It is known from Panama.

References

Ptericoptus
Beetles described in 1880
Beetles of South America